Clifford Lely Mollison (30 March 1897 – 4 June 1986) was a British stage, film and television actor. He made his stage debut in 1913. He was married to the actress Avril Wheatley. His younger brother was the actor Henry Mollison.

Mollison acted in the West End on a number of occasions. In 1921 he appeared at the Strand Theatre in Ian Hay's A Safety Match. In 1923 he was in Charles McEvoy's The Likes of Her. In 1925 he starred in the play The River by Patrick Hastings. In 1953 he appeared in Peter Ustinov's The Love of Four Colonels.

Filmography

References

External links
 

1897 births
1986 deaths
English male stage actors
English male film actors
Male actors from London
20th-century English male actors